The Rumble is a 1999 album by Abhinanda on Desperate Fight Records. In Spain the album was issued by Locomotive Music.

Track list 
 "Junior" 		
 "Highway Tonight" 		
 "The Rumble" 		
 "Easy Digestion" 		
 "Showdown" 		
 "No 1" 		
 "Centipede" 		
 "The Preacher" 		
 "Take It Away" 		
 "Shuffle the Deck" 		
 "La Musica Continua"

References 

1999 albums